The Tulu Wikipedia is the Tulu language edition of Wikipedia, run by the Wikimedia Foundation. It currently has  articles and it is the  largest edition of Wikipedia by article count. It is the 23rd language of India to get a Wikipedia after eight years in incubation.

History 
Katherine Maher, the executive director of Wikimedia Foundation announced the launch of the Tulu Wikipedia as a full site at the WIkiConference 2016. It was in incubation since 2008. As of August 2016, it had 200 registered editors with 10 of them being active, and over 1000 articles. It was the 23rd language from India to have a Wikipedia edition.

Users and editors

See also 
 Kannada Wikipedia
 Malayalam Wikipedia
 Tamil Wikipedia
 Telugu Wikipedia

References

Further reading

External links 

 Tulu Wikipedia
 Wikipedia.org multilingual portal
 Wikimedia Foundation

Wikipedias by language
Tulu language
Internet properties established in 2008
Indian encyclopedias
Wikipedia in India